Bernardo Pereira Folha (born 23 March 2002) is a Portuguese professional footballer who plays as a midfielder for FC Porto B.

Club career
Born in Porto, Folha joined FC Porto's youth system at age 8. On 18 December 2020, he renewed his contract with the club until 2024.

Folha made his Liga Portugal 2 debut with the reserves on 14 February 2021, coming on as a second-half substitute in a 1–2 home loss against U.D. Oliveirense and being sent off with a straight red card after only nine minutes on the pitch. He scored his first goal in the competition one month later, opening the 1–1 away draw with G.D. Chaves following an individual effort.

Folha's first competitive appearance for the main squad took place on 15 December 2021, when he replaced Sérgio Oliveira late into the 1–0 win over Rio Ave F.C. in the group stage of the Taça da Liga. In the following edition of the tournament he contributed four appearances for the winners, scoring in the semi-finals on 25 January 2023 to help defeat Académico de Viseu F.C. 3–0. On 1 February, his Primeira Liga bow, he was again ejected, after two bookings in the first half of an eventual 2–0 victory at C.S. Marítimo who also finished with ten players.

International career
Folha won his first cap for Portugal at under-21 level on 29 March 2022, coming on for Fábio Carvalho in the 4–0 win in Greece for the 2023 UEFA European Championship qualifiers.

Personal life
Folha's father, António, was also a footballer. A winger, he was also developed at Porto, and coached his son at the reserve team.

Career statistics

Honours
Porto
Taça da Liga: 2022–23

References

External links

2002 births
Living people
Portuguese footballers
Footballers from Porto
Association football midfielders
Primeira Liga players
Liga Portugal 2 players
Padroense F.C. players
FC Porto B players
FC Porto players
Portugal youth international footballers
Portugal under-21 international footballers